Christopher Thomas Boyle (born 10 June 1982) is a Scottish footballer who played for Kilmarnock, Dumbarton and Albion Rovers.

References

1982 births
Scottish footballers
Dumbarton F.C. players
Albion Rovers F.C. players
Scottish Football League players
Living people
Footballers from Irvine, North Ayrshire
Kilmarnock F.C. players
Association football midfielders